The cities which are listed in bold are the headquarter of the respective District.
‡ — State Capital

See also 

List of cities in India by area
List of cities in Jharkhand by population

References

India, Jharkhand cities
Jharkhand
Cities by area